A1 Team France is the French team of A1 Grand Prix, an international racing series. The team were the A1 Grand Prix champions for the inaugural season, 2005-06.

Management 
A1 Team France's owner is Jean-Paul Driot. The team was previously managed by Driot's racing team Driot Associates Motor Sport (DAMS) since the series debut, but has switched to Connor Racing for the 2008–09 season.

History

2008–09 season 

Driver: Loïc Duval

2007–08 season 

Drivers: Jonathan Cochet, Loïc Duval, Nicolas Lapierre, Franck Montagny

Team France remained competitive during 2007–08, with a win and six podiums leaving them in 4th position overall.

2006–07 season 

Drivers: Loïc Duval, Nicolas Lapierre, Jean Karl Vernay

Team France fell from grace in 2006–07, however still managed to score seven podiums to finish 4th in the championship.

2005–06 season 

Drivers: Nicolas Lapierre, Alexandre Premat

Team France were the dominant force during the inaugural season, winning thirteen of the 22 rounds, and becoming runaway champions.

Drivers

Complete A1 Grand Prix results 
(key), "spr" indicate a Sprint Race, "fea" indicate a Main Race.

References

External links
A1gp.com Official A1 Grand Prix Web Site
Official Team website - A1 Team France
Official Team website - DAMS

France A1 team
French auto racing teams
National sports teams of France
Auto racing teams established in 2005
Auto racing teams disestablished in 2009